The IWRG 16th Anniversary Show was an annual professional wrestling major event produced by Mexican professional wrestling promotion International Wrestling Revolution Group (IWRG), which took place on January 1, 2012 in Arena Naucalpan, Naucalpan, State of Mexico, Mexico. The event commemorated the creation of IWRG on January 1, 1996 by promoter Adolfo Moreno. In the main event Multifacético (the fourth wrestler to use that name) defeated Apolo Estrada, Jr. in a Lucha de Apuesta, or bet match, where both wrestlers put their hair on the line and as a result Estrada Jr. was shaved bald after the match.

Production

Background
The 2012 International Wrestling Revolution Group (IWRG; Sometimes referred to as Grupo Internacional Revolución in Spanish) anniversary show commemorated the 16th anniversary of IWRG's creation as a wrestling promotion and holding their first show on January 1, 1996. The Anniversary show, as well as the majority of the IWRG shows in general are held in "Arena Naucalpan", owned by the promoters of IWRG and their main arena. The Anniversary Shows generally take place on January 1 each year whenever possible.

Storylines
The event featured five professional wrestling matches with different wrestlers involved in pre-existing scripted feuds, plots and storylines. Wrestlers were portrayed as either heels (referred to as rudos in Mexico, those that portray the "bad guys") or faces (técnicos in Mexico, the "good guy" characters) as they followed a series of tension-building events, which culminated in a wrestling match or series of matches.

Results

References

External links 
 

2012 in professional wrestling
2012 in Mexico
16
January 2012 events in Mexico